Spring Break Lawyer is a 2001 American made-for-TV comedy film, starring Brad Raider, Busy Philipps and Sean Murray. It was written by Adam 'Tex' Davis and directed by Alan Cohn. The film was first aired at MTV on March 23, 2001.

Plot
Jay Garvey (Brad Raider) is kicked out of law school for a prank involving a cadaver; his friend and erstwhile caretaker of said cadaver, Nick (Sean Murray), is correspondingly kicked out of medical school. They travel to Florida during spring break and together help fraudulently secure acquittals for partygoers accused of drunken crimes with the help of forged doctor's notes. Senator Claxton (Gary Grubbs) seeks to crack down on drunken misbehavior and participates in the railroading of Leon, an innocent defendant. Meanwhile, Jay and Nick are jailed for petty crimes. Through careful maneuvering, Jay manages to exonerate himself, Nick, and Leon.

Cast
 Brad Raider as Jay Garvey
 Busy Philipps as Jenny
 Sean Murray as Nick Kepper
 Travis Wester as Leon Hornberger
 Adrienne Barbeau as Judge Stern

Reception
Robert Pardi of TV Guide gave the film only one star out of five and wrote: "College kids whose brains have been fried by too much the sun are clearly the target audience for this screwed-up escapade, which is undermined by an excess of testosterone and a juvenile obsession with flatulence."

References

External links
 
 

Films scored by Roger Neill
2000s English-language films
American comedy television films
2001 comedy films
2001 television films
2000s American films